Leo Thomas "Dee" Walsh (March 28, 1890 – July 14, 1971) was a Major League Baseball outfielder and shortstop who played for three seasons. He played for the St. Louis Browns from 1913 to 1915, playing in 89 career games.

External links

1890 births
1971 deaths
Baseball players from Missouri
Major League Baseball outfielders
Major League Baseball shortstops
St. Louis Browns players
St. Louis Cardinals scouts
Mobile Sea Gulls players
Chattanooga Lookouts players
Rochester Hustlers players
Louisville Colonels (minor league) players
Milwaukee Brewers (minor league) players
Little Rock Travelers players
San Francisco Seals (baseball) players
Portland Beavers players